1693 Hertzsprung is a dark and elongated background asteroid from the middle region of the asteroid belt, approximately 39 kilometers in diameter. It was discovered on 5 May 1935, by Dutch astronomer Hendrik van Gent at the Leiden Southern Station, annex to the Johannesburg Observatory in South Africa.

Classification and orbit 

Hertzsprung orbits the Sun in the central main-belt at a distance of 2.0–3.6 AU once every 4 years and 8 months (1,707 days). Its orbit has an eccentricity of 0.27 and an inclination of 12° with respect to the ecliptic. This observation, however, remained unused and the body's observation arc begins with its official discovery observation at Johannesburg in 1935.

Naming 

This minor planet was named in memory of Danish chemist and astronomer Ejnar Hertzsprung (1873–1967), best known for the famous Hertzsprung–Russell diagram, a spectral classification system for stars he developed jointly with Russel, after whom the asteroid  was named. From 1934 to 1945, Hertzsprung was the head of the Leiden Observatory in the Netherlands.

As a prominent expert in photometry, he initiated a survey of variable stars in the Southern Milky Way at the Leiden Southern Station. A number of asteroids and comets were also discovered during the course of this survey. The asteroid's name was suggested by the staff at Leiden Observatory. The official  was published by the Minor Planet Center on 15 December 1967.

Physical characteristics

Diameter and albedo 

According to the space-based surveys carried out by the Infrared Astronomical Satellite IRAS, the Japanese Akari satellite, and NASA's Wide-field Infrared Survey Explorer with its subsequent NEOWISE mission, Hertzsprung measures between 30.95 and 41.97 kilometers in diameter and its surface has an albedo between 0.03 and 0.059.

The Collaborative Asteroid Lightcurve Link agrees with the results obtained by IRAS, that is an albedo of 0.048 and a diameter of 38.7 kilometers with an absolute magnitude of 10.97. While the dark C-type asteroid is classified as a rare CBU-subtype on the Tholen taxonomic scheme, the NEOWISE mission groups the body to the rare and reddish P-type asteroids.

Rotation and shape 

In August 1987, a rotational lightcurve of Hertzsprung was obtained from photometric observations made with the ESO 1-metre telescope at La Silla Observatory in Chile. The lightcurve gave it a well-defined rotation period of  hours with a brightness amplitude of 0.45 magnitude. Observations by the NEOWISE mission found higher amplitudes of 0.70 and 1.05, which indicates that the body has a non-spheroidal or elongated shape.

References

External links 
 Asteroid Lightcurve Database (LCDB), query form (info )
 Dictionary of Minor Planet Names, Google books
 Asteroids and comets rotation curves, CdR – Observatoire de Genève, Raoul Behrend
 Discovery Circumstances: Numbered Minor Planets (1)-(5000) – Minor Planet Center
 
 

001693
Discoveries by Hendrik van Gent
Named minor planets
001693
19350505